Cassipourea swaziensis (Swazi onionwood) is a species of plant in the Rhizophoraceae family. It is found in South Africa and Eswatini. It is threatened by habitat loss, and a protected tree in South Africa.

References

swaziensis
Data deficient plants
Protected trees of South Africa
Taxonomy articles created by Polbot
Taxa named by Robert Harold Compton